Defending champions Nikola Mektić and Mate Pavić defeated John Isner and Diego Schwartzman in the final, 6–2, 6–7(6–8), [12–10] to win the men's doubles tennis title at the 2022 Italian Open. The pair saved a championship point en route to their tenth career title as a team.

Seeds

Draw

Finals

Top half

Bottom half

Seeded teams
The following are the seeded teams, based on ATP rankings as of 2 May 2022.

Other entry information

Wildcards

Alternates

Withdrawals
Before the tournament
  Marin Čilić /  Ivan Dodig → replaced by  Ivan Dodig /  Austin Krajicek
  Taylor Fritz /  Reilly Opelka → replaced by  Reilly Opelka /  Tommy Paul
  Marcel Granollers /  Horacio Zeballos → replaced by  Julio Peralta /  Franko Škugor
  Karen Khachanov /  Andrey Rublev → replaced by  Lloyd Glasspool /  Harri Heliövaara
  Marcelo Melo /  Alexander Zverev → replaced by  Aslan Karatsev /  Marcelo Melo

References

External links
Main draw

Doubles men
Italian Open - Doubles